The 2019–20 Women's England Hockey League season (sponsored by Investec) is the 2019–20 season of England's field hockey league structure. The season started on 14 September 2019 and was due to end in April 2020 but finished on 5 September 2020 due to COVID-19 pandemic in the United Kingdom. 

The defending champions are Surbiton. Conference North champions Loughborough Students and Conference East champions Hampstead & Westminster replaced the relegated Slough and Canterbury respectively. 

Surbiton were declared champions following the end of the regular season because the playoffs were curtailed on 17 March 2020 due to COVID-19. Beeston Hockey Club won the delayed Championship Cup on 5 September 2020, defeating the defending champions Clifton Robinsons Hockey Club 3-2 in the final.

Competing teams

Premier League

+ Bowdon deducted 3 points for fielding an ineligible player

Play Offs

Semi-finals

Final

England Hockey Women's Championship Cup

Quarter-finals

Semi-finals

Final

See also
2019–20 Men's Hockey League season

References

2019–20
England
2019 in English sport
2020 in English sport
Hockey League